Odintsovo is the name of several inhabited localities in Russia.

Urban localities
Odintsovo, a city in Odintsovsky District of Moscow Oblast

Rural localities
Odintsovo, Ivanovo Oblast, a village in Shuysky District of Ivanovo Oblast
Odintsovo, Kostroma Oblast, a village in Povalikhinskoye Settlement of Chukhlomsky District of Kostroma Oblast
Odintsovo, Domodedovo, Moscow Oblast, a village under the administrative jurisdiction of the Domodedovo City Under Oblast Jurisdiction, Moscow Oblast
Odintsovo, Nizhny Novgorod Oblast, a village in Luzhaysky Selsoviet of Shakhunya, Nizhny Novgorod Oblast
Odintsovo, Pestovsky District, Novgorod Oblast, a village in Bogoslovskoye Settlement of Pestovsky District of Novgorod Oblast
Odintsovo, Poddorsky District, Novgorod Oblast, a village in Poddorskoye Settlement of Poddorsky District of Novgorod Oblast
Odintsovo, Perm Krai, a village in Karagaysky District of Perm Krai
Odintsovo, Tyoplo-Ogaryovsky District, Tula Oblast, a village in Ivanovsky Rural Okrug of Tyoplo-Ogaryovsky District of Tula Oblast
Odintsovo, Yasnogorsky District, Tula Oblast, a selo in Pervomayskaya Rural Territory of Yasnogorsky District of Tula Oblast
Odintsovo, Kimrsky District, Tver Oblast, a village in Kimrsky District, Tver Oblast
Odintsovo, Sonkovsky District, Tver Oblast, a village in Sonkovsky District, Tver Oblast
Odintsovo, Vladimir Oblast, a village in Sudogodsky District of Vladimir Oblast